Pizza is the third album by French rocker Alain Bashung, issued in 1981 on Philips Records.

Production 
This album immediately followed Bashung's breakthrough single, "Gaby oh Gaby" (which was added on the CD reissues of the album). Lyricist Boris Bergman wrote part of the lyrics, the other part was made of improvisations by Bashung. The album features a somewhat surreal mood, with abstract lyrics, full of double entendres, plays on words, puns and automatic writing. For instance, when talking about how a girl pisses him off on "Vertige de l'amour" ("Love vertigo"), his second hit single which helped bolster the sales of the album, Bergman wrote "Si ça continue j'vais me découper" ("if it goes on like this I'm gonna cut myself"), the verb "découper" (which means "cut") being used instead of "j'vais me casser" ("casser" both meaning "leave" and "break" in French), to which Bashung improvised "suivant les pointillés" ("along the dotted line").

Reception

Commercial performance 
Pizza hit #1 on the French charts.

Critical reception 
In 2010, the French edition of Rolling Stone magazine named this album the 19th greatest French rock album (out of 100). In his book La discothèque parfaite de l'odyssée du rock, Gilles Verlant, although he did not include the album in his list of essential albums, qualified the album string of Roulette russe / Pizza as a "triumph".

Track listing

Bonus Tracks (CD reissue)

Personnel
Alain Bashung - vocals
Olivier Guindon, Richard Brunton - guitar
François Delage - bass
Tommy Eyre - keyboards
Philippe Draï - drums
Liam Genockey - percussion
Mel Collins - saxophone

Singles 
 1981 : Vertige de l'amour / Ça cache quekchose (France : 1)
 1981 : Rebel / Reviens va-t-en (France : 19)

Certifications

References 

1981 albums
Barclay (record label) albums
Alain Bashung albums
Albums recorded at Rockfield Studios